Streptomyces gramineus is a bacterium species from the genus of Streptomyces which has been isolated from the rhizosphere soil of the plant Sasa borealis.

See also 
 List of Streptomyces species

References

Further reading

External links
Type strain of Streptomyces gramineus at BacDive -  the Bacterial Diversity Metadatabase

gramineus
Bacteria described in 2012